Arraias is a municipality located in the Brazilian state of Tocantins. Its population was 10,534 (2020) and its area is 5,787 km².

The city is served by Arraias Airport.

References

Municipalities in Tocantins